The Roman Catholic Diocese of Santarém is a Latin Church ecclesiastical territory or diocese of the Catholic Church in Portugal. Erected in 1975, the diocese is a suffragan in the ecclesiastical province of the metropolitan Patriarchate of Lisbon. Its episcopal see at Santarém is north-east of Lisbon.

, the bishop is Manuel Pelino Domingues, appointed in 1998.

Ordinaries
António Francisco Marques, O.F.M. † (16 Jul 1975 Appointed - 28 Aug 1997 Died)
Manuel Pelino Domingues (27 Jan 1998 Appointed - )

References

External links
 http://www.agencia.ecclesia.pt/dioceses/santarem.asp

Santarem
Santarem, Roman Catholic Diocese of